Metepenagiag (pronounced MET-EHH-PE-NAH-GHEE-AH), also known as Red Bank is a Mi'kmaq First Nation band government in New Brunswick, Canada on the other side of the Miramichi river from Sunny Corner.

Pre-history
Metepenagiag Mi'kmaq Nation are located at the head of tide of the Miramichi River. For thousands of years Mi’kmaq communities along New Brunswick’s northeastern shore lived near tidal estuaries where tidal saltwater flows inland and creates an ecosystem for "anadromous fish species such as salmon, sturgeon, gaspereau or alewife, striped bass, and eel, that seasonally move up the estuaries in large numbers." Some of these species spawned above the ‘head of tide’ and up the freshwater streams.

Although officially recognised in 1783, Metepenagiag has been home to a Mi'kmaq community for over 3000 years, making it the oldest continuously settled community in New Brunswick.

Augustine Mound
Evidence for the age of the community was revealed in 1972 by Joseph Mike Augustine. After reading a 1972 National Geographic article about an ancient burial mound in Arizona, Augustine recalled the mound where his father had taken him near his home. The mound was on the caribou hunting trail that he and his father used regularly and they stopped to rest there.

The artifacts found at the site (the Augustine Mound), and a second nearby site (the Oxbow site) demonstrated that Metepenagiag had been continuously inhabited for over 3000 years, and that the community enjoyed trading relationships with other First Nations communities, stretching as far west as the Ohio River Valley.

There has been some disagreement among residents concerning naming this important cultural and spiritual site, The Augustine Mound. While it was Joe Mike Augustine who first brought attention to the ancient burial site, most residents were aware of its existence. The name also falsely suggests that it is only the resting place of members of the Augustine family. While this is likely true, the mound was likely a community burial site, meaning that many of the oldest families of Metepenagiag have ancestors interred therein. Some feel the much more inclusive "Metepenagiag Mound" would better describe and honor those whose remains lie beneath the mound.

In 1975 the Augustine Mound was designated as a National Historic Site of Canada. The Augustine Mound has similarities to the elaborate burial rites of the Adena culture of the Ohio Valley and contained materials that were not local including copper from Lake Superior area. Turnbull argues that the Red Bank people were part of a broad Northeastern pre-contact trade network. He also suggested that some Maritime people adopted aspects of the Adena culture and religion. Keenlyside claims that Adena culture peoples moved to Atlantic Canada. Ceramic fragments also found at Red Bank are illustrative of the ceramic technology in use by Maritime First Nations 2,500 to 3,000 years ago.

Oxbow
In 1982, the nearby Oxbow archaeological site, located within the reserve land of the Metepenagiag Mi’kmaq Nation on an oxbow bend of the Southwest Miramichi River, was also designated a National Historic Site of Canada for its role as "witness and record of 3000 years of continuous Mi’kmaq use of the site". Over 100 additional archaeological sites have been discovered in the area since 1975. Metepenagiaq First Nations now has their Metepenagiag Heritage Park.

History

Although the Red Bank Band lands established by the New Brunswick Order-in-Council in 1808 comprised 10,000 acres, settlers and squatters occupied almost all of allocated land by the late 1830s. Only the village at Red Bank and the back wood lots were left for the Band. Under the Specific Claims Policy (2005), it was found that the 1895 alleged surrender of land was invalid and the Metepenagiag Mi'kmaq Nation negotiated for more land.

Notable people

Joe Mike Augustine - discoverer of the Augustine Mound
Noah Augustine - Native activist and former chief

See also
List of communities in New Brunswick
List of First Nations in New Brunswick

Further reading

References

External links
http://www.metepenagiag.org
 http://www.metpark.ca/

Communities in Northumberland County, New Brunswick
First Nations in New Brunswick
Mi'kmaq in Canada